A great number of words of French origin have entered the English language to the extent that many Latin words have come to the English language.

S

sabayon
sabbat
sable
sabot
sabotage
saboteur
sabre
snake
saccade
sacerdotal
sachet
sack
sackbut
sacrament,  Old Fr. , compare Mod. Fr. 
sacramental
sacré bleu
sacred
sacrifice
sacrilege
sacristy
sadism
safe, Old Fr. 
safeguard, Middle Fr. 
safety
saffron
sagacity
sage
saint
Saint-Louis (named for Louis IX of France)
salad
salamander
salary
saline
salmagundi
salmon
salon
saloon, compare 
salsify
saltire
saltpetre
salutary
salutation
salvage
salver
samite
sample, Old Fr. 
sanctify
sanctimony
sanctity
sanctuary
sandal
sang-froid
sangrail
sanguine
sanitary
sanity
sans
sans-culotte
sap (v.)
sapience
sapient
saponification
sapphire
Saracen, Old Fr. 
sardine
sardonic
sash [window], Fr. 
sashay, Fr. 
satchel
satellite
satiety
satin
satiric
satisfy
sauce, Old Fr. 
saucer
sault
sausage
sauté
sauterne
savage, Old Fr. 
savant
savate
save, Anglo-Fr. , from Old Fr. , compare Mod. Fr. 
saveloy
savior
savoir-faire
savor
savory
savvy, pidgin, from Fr. 
saxifrage
saxophone
scabbard
scaffold
scald
scale
scallion
scallop
scandal
scandalous
scantling
scar
scarab
Scaramouche
scarce
scarcity
scarification
scarlet
scavenger, Anglo-Fr. , from Old N. Fr. 
scene
scenic
scent
scepter or sceptre
schedule
schism
schismatic
schist
scholar
scholastic
sciatic
science
scientific
scimitar
scion
scissors
sconce
scorn
scorpion
scoundrel
scourge
scout, Old Fr. 
screen, Anglo-Fr., from Old N. Fr. , compare Old Fr.  and Mod. Fr. 
screw, Middle Fr. 
script
scrivener, Anglo-Fr , from Old Fr.  compare Mod. Fr. 
scruple
scrupulous
scullery
scullion
sculpt
scuttle
seal, Old Fr. , compare Mod. Fr. , 
séance
search, Old Fr. , compare Mod. Fr. 
season, Old Fr. , compare Mod. Fr. 
seat
secateurs
second
secrecy
secret
secretariat
secretion
sect
section
secular
security
sedentary
sediment
sedimentary
sedition
seditious
seduction
see (n.)
seigneur
seigniorage
seisin
seize
semantic
semaphore
semblance
seminal
sempiternal
senate
seneschal
senile
sense
sensitive
sensuality
sentence, Old Fr. 
sentiment, Fr. 
sentinel
sepal
separable
separation
septillion (from  seven)
sepulchre
sepulture
sequel
sequence
sequent
sequester
sequin
serenade
serenity
serf (Old Fr. )
serge
sergeant or serjeant, from Old French, compare modern Fr. 
serious
sermon
serolous
serpent
serpentine
servant
serve
service
serviceable
serviette
servitude
sesame
session
set
sever
several, Anglo-Fr. , from Old Fr. 
severance
severe
severity
sewer
sex
sexton
Seychelles, named for Jean Moreau de Séchelles
shallop
shallot
shammy
shanty
shawm
shay, corruption of  mistaken as a plural
shivaree
siege
sign
signal
signature
signet
signification
signify
silage
silence
silhouette
similar, Fr. 
similarly
similitude
simnel
simple, Old Fr. 
simplicity
simplification
simplify
simulation
simultaneity
sincere
sincerity
single
singular
singularity
sinister
Sioux
siphon
sir
sire
siren
sirloin
site
situation
size
skein
skew
skiff
skillet
skim
skink
skirmish, Old Fr. 
slander
slat
slate
slave
slender
slice, Old Fr. 
slot, Old Fr. 
sluice
soar
sober, Old Fr. 
sobriety, Fr. 
sobriquet
sociable, Fr. 
social, Fr. 
socialism, Fr. 
society, Old Fr. 
sociology
socket
sodality
soigné
soil
soirée
sojourn (Old Fr. )
solace
solder
soldier
sole
solemn
solemnity
solemnize
solicit, Old Fr. 
solicitation
solicitor, Old Fr. 
solicitude
solid
solidarity, Fr. 
solidary
solidification
solidify
solidity
solitaire
solitude
solstice
soluble
solution
solvent
somatic
sombre or somber, Fr. 
somersault
sommelier
somnolence
somnolent
sonde
sonnet
sonority
sophistry
soporific
sorb
sorbet
sorcerer
sorcery
sorrel
sort, Old Fr. 
sortie
sot
soubrette
soubriquet
soufflé
souk, Fr. , from Arabic 
sound, (n.) Old Fr. , (v.) Old Fr. 
soup
soupçon
source
sous-chef
souse
souteneur
souvenir
sovereign, Old Fr. , compare Mod. Fr. 
sovereignty
space, Old Fr. 
spacious
Spain, Anglo-Fr. , from Old Fr. 
spandrel
Spaniard, Old Fr. 
spaniel, Old Fr. 
spasm
spavin
spawn
spay
special
speciality
specific
specificity
specify
spectacle
spectre
speculation
speculative
sphere
sphincter
spice, Old Fr. , compare Mod. Fr. 
spinach
spine, Old Fr. , compare Mod. Fr. 
spinney
spiral
spirit, Old Fr. , compare Mod. Fr. 
spiritual
spirituality
spleen
splendour or splendor, Middle Fr. , compare Mod. Fr. 
spoil
spool
sport, Old Fr. , compare Mod. Fr. 
spouse
sprite
spume
spurge
spy, Old Fr. , compare Mod. Fr. 
squad, Fr. 
squadron, Middle Fr. 
square
squash
squat
squirrel
stability
stable
stage, Old Fr. 
stagnant
stallion
stance
stanch
stanchion
standard, Old Fr. , compare Mod. Fr. 
state, Old Fr. , compare Mod. Fr. 
station
statue
statuette
stature
statute
staunch
stay
stere
steppe
stereotype
sterile
stethoscope
stew
stipe
stipule
stolid
stomach
store
story, Old Fr. 
stour
stout
strain (v.)
strait
strange
strangle
stratagem
strategy
stratify
stratosphere
stray
stress,Old Fr. 
strident
strife
strive
strop
structure, Old Fr. 
strychnine
stubble
student
study, Old Fr. , compare Mod. Fr. 
stuff, Old Fr. , compare Mod. Fr. 
stupefaction
stupefy
stupid, Middle Fr. 
sturdy
sturgeon, Old Fr. 
style
suave
subaltern
subdue
subject, Old Fr. , compare Mod. Fr. 
subjection
sublime
submission
subordination
subsequent
subsidiary
subsidy
substance
substantial
substitution
subterfuge
subtle
subtlety
subvention
subversion
subvert
succeed
succession
successor
succinct
succour
succulence
succulent
succumb, Middle Fr. 
sucrose
sudden
sue
suede
suet
suffer, Old Fr. , compare Mod. Fr. 
suffice
sufficient
suffocation
suffragan
suffrage
sugar
suggestion
suit
suite
suitor
sullen
sully
sulphate
sulphur
sulphuric
sultan
sum
sumac
summer (horizontal beam)
summit
summon
sumpter
sumptuous
superfluity
superior
superiority
superlative
supernal
superposition
superscript
supersede
superstition
superstitious
supper
supplant
supple
suppliant
supplication
supply
support, Old Fr. 
suppose, Old Fr. 
supreme
surcease
surcharge
surcingle
surcoat
sure, Old Fr. Fr. 
surety, Old Fr. , compare Mod. Fr. 
surface
surfeit
surge
surgeon, Anglo-Fr. , from Old Fr. Fr.  
surgery, Anglo-Fr. , from Old Fr. Fr. 
surmise
surmount, Old Fr. , compare Mod. Fr. 
surname, Anglo-Fr.  later respelled, from Old Fr. 
surpass
surplice
surplus
surprise
surreal
surrealism, Fr. 
surrender, Old Fr. 
surtax
surveillance
survey
surveyor
survive
suspect
suspend
suspense, Old Fr. 
suspension
suspicion
suspicious
sustain
sustenance
sustentation
suzerainty
svelte
swage, Old Fr. 
Swiss
sycamore
syllable
syllogism
symbolise
symbolist
sympathy
symphony
synagogue
syndic
syndicalism
syndicate
syntax
synthetic
syrup

T

tabard
tabby
tabernacle
tablature
table
tableau
table d'hôte
tablet
tabor
tacit
taciturn
tack
tactile
taffeta
tail
tailor, Old Fr. 
taint
talc
talent
talisman
tally
talon
talus
tambour
tambourine
tamp
tampion
tampon
tan
tangerine
tangible
tanner
tannery
tannin
tansy
tantamount, Anglo-Fr. , from Old Fr.  (as much) +  (amount)
tap (v.)
tapenade
tapestry
tapir
tapis
tardy
tare
target
tarnish, Middle Fr. , from 
tarot
tart [pie], Old Fr. 
tartan
tartar, Old Fr. 
tartare, Fr. 
tartuffe
task, Old North. Fr. , Old Fr. , compare Mod. Fr. 
tassel
taste, Old Fr. 
Tatar, Old Fr. 
taupe
tavern
tawny, Anglo-Fr. , from Old Fr. 
tax, Old Fr. 
taxation
taximeter, Fr. 
taxonomy
tay
teat, Old Fr. 
technique
tedious
telecommunication
telegraph, Fr. 
telemeter
telephone
television
temerity
temperance
tempest, Old Fr. , compare Mod. Fr. 
Templar, Anglo-Fr. , from Old Fr. 
temple [anatomy]
temporal, Old Fr. 
temporize
tempt, Old Fr. , compare Mod. Fr. 
temptation, Old Fr. , compare Mod. Fr. 
tenable
tenacity
tenant
tench, Old Fr. 
tend, Old Fr. 
tender
tendon, Middle Fr. 
tendril
tenebrous
tenement
tennis, Old Fr. , to start the game
tenon
tenor
tense
tension
tent
tentative
tenter
tenure
tercel
term
termagant
terrace, Old Fr. 
terrain
terrible
terrier
terrify
terrine
terror, Old Fr. 
terrorism (first used during French Revolution)
terse
test
testament
tetany
tete
tête-à-tête
text
texture
theatre
theme
theodicy
theologian
theology, Old Fr. 
theorem, Middle Fr. 
theory
thermal
thermometer
throne
thyme
tic
ticket
tier
tierce
tiffany
tiger
tigress
till (n.)
tillage
tiller
timbre
timbrel
timid
timidity
timocracy
timorous
Timothy
tinsel
tirade
tisane
tissue
title
titration
titre
titular
toast
toboggan
tocsin
tog
toil
toile
toilet, Middle Fr. 
toilette
tole
tolerable
tolerance
tolerant
toleration
tomb
tome
tonality
tone
tonnage
tonne
tonneau
tonsure
tontine
topaz
toque
torch
torchere
torment
tormentor
torrent
torsades de pointes
torsion
tort
tortfeasor
tortious
tortuous
torture
total
toucan
touch
touche
toupée
tour
tourbillon
tour de force
tournament
tournedos
tourney
tourniquet
tout de suite or toot sweet, compare 
towel, Old Fr. 
toxic
toxicology
trace
track
tradition
traffic
tragedian
tragedy
tragicomedy
trail
train
trait
traitor
trammel
trance
tranche
tranquil
tranquillise
tranquillity
transaction
transfigure
transfix
transform
transformation
transgress
transgression
transitivity
transitory
translation
translator
transmutation
transmute
transpiration
transpire
transport
transpose
transposition
trapeze
Trappist
traumatise
travail
trave
travel
traverse
travesty
Travis
travois
treacherous
treachery
treacle
treason
treasure
treasury
treat
treatise
treatment
treaty
treble
trebuchet
trefoil
trellis
tremble
tremor
trench
trenchant
trepan
très
trespass
tress
trestle
trey
triage
trial
triangle
tribe, Old Fr. 
tribulation
tribunal
trick
tricolour
tricot
tricycle
trifle
trillion
trimester
trine
trinity
trip
tripe
trist
Tristan
trite
triumph
trochanter
trochee
trompe l'œil
troop, Middle Fr. 
trophy
troposphere
trot
troubadour
trouble
trounce
troupe
trousseau
trout
trove
trowel
troy
truant
truck (v.)
truckle
truculence
truculent
truffle
trumeau
trump
trumpery
trumpet
truncheon
trunk
trunnion
truss
try, Old Fr. 
tryst
tuba
tube
tuff
tuffet
tuft
tuition
tulip
tulle
tumbrel
tumescence
tumour
tumult
tumultuous
tunic
tunnel
tunny
turban
turbine
turbot
turbulent
tureen
Turk
turmoil
turn
turpentine
turpitude
turquoise
turret
turtle
tutor
tutu
typography
tyranny
tyrant Old Fr.

U

ubiquity
ulcer
ultramontane
umber
umbrage
umbrageous
umpire
unanimity
uncle
unctuous
unicorn
uniform
uniformity
unify
union
unique
unison
unity
universal
universality
universe
university
urbane
urbanise
urbanity
urchin
urea
urethane
urgent
urgent
uric
urinal
urine
usable
usage
use
usher
usual
usurer
usurious
usurp
usurp
usurpation
usurper
utensil
uterine
utile
utilisation
utilise
utility

V

vacant
vacation
vacuole
vagabond
vagrant
vague
vail
vain
vainglorious
vainglory
vair
valance
vale
valerian
Valerie
valet
valiance
valiant
valid
validation
validity
valise
valley
valour
valuation
value
vampire
vandalism
vanguard
vanish
vanity
vanquish
vantage
vaporisation
vaporous
vapour
variable
variance
variant
variation
variety
various
varlet
varnish
varvel
vary
vase
vassal
vassalage
vast, Middle Fr. 
vaudeville
vault
vaunt
veal, Anglo-Fr. , from Old Fr. , compare Mod. Fr. 
vedette
veer
vegetable
vegetation
vegetative
vehemence
vehement
vehicle
veil
vein
vellum
velocipede
velocity
velodrome
velour
velvet
venal
venality
vend
vendor
venerable
veneration
venge
vengeance
venial
venison
venom
venomous
vent
ventilation
ventral
ventre à terre
venue
veracity
verb
verbal
verbalise
verbiage
verbosity
verdant
verdict
verdigris
verdure
verge
verger
verification
verify
verisimilitude
veritable
verity
vermeil
vermilion
vermin
Vermont
vermouth
vernier
verse
versicle
versify
version
vers libre
vert
vertical
vertiginous
vervain
verve
vervet
very, Old Fr. , compare Mod. Fr. 
vesicle
vesper
vessel, Old Fr. , compare Mod. Fr. 
vest
vestibule
vestige
vestment
vestry
vesture
vetch
veteran
vex
vexation
viable
viand
vibrant
vibration
vicar
vice
viceroy
vichyssoise
vicious
vicissitude
victim
victimology
victory
victual
vie, Old Fr. 
view, Old Fr. , compare Mod. Fr. 
vigil
vigilance
vigneron
vignette
vigorous
vigour
vile
village, Old Fr. 
villain, Old Fr. 
villainous
villainy
villein
vinaigrette
Vincent
vindicative
vine
vinegar
vintage
vintner
viol, Middle Fr. 
violation
violence, Old Fr. 
violet
violon d’Ingres
viper
virgin, Old Fr. 
virginal
virginity
virgule
virile
virility
virion
virology
virtue
virulence
visa
visage
vis-à-vis
visceral
viscosity
viscount
viscous
vise
visibility
visible
vision
visionary
visit
visitant
visitation
visitor
visor
visualisation
visualise
vital
vitalise
vitality
vitreous
vitrify
vitrine
vitriol
vitriolic
vivify
vocal
vocative
vogue
voice
void
voilà
voile
voir dire
volant
volatile
volcanic
volcanism
volition
volley
volte-face
voltigeur
voluble
volume, Old Fr. 
voluntary
volunteer
voluptuous
volute
voodoo
voracity
vote
votive
vouch
voucher
vow
vowel
voyage, Old Fr. , compare Mod. Fr. 
voyeur
vue
vulture

W
Many imported words beginning with "w" in English have cognates in French that start with a "g" or "gu". This is because the English word was not borrowed directly from French or Old French, but from some of the northern langue d'oïl dialects such as Picard and Norman, where the original "w" sound was preserved (the majority of these words are words of Germanic origin, and stem mainly from either the Frankish language, or other ancient Germanic languages, like Burgundian). In Old French, the initial "w" sound was prefixed by the letter "g" as "gw" and then the "w" sound was later lost. The "w" survives in orthography as "u" in "gu", but only to produce a hard "g" sound.

wafer (Cf Old Fr. )
wage (Cf Old Fr. )
wager, (Cf Old Fr. ).
wait, Old N. Fr.  [to watch] (compare modern Fr. ), from Frankish 
waive, Anglo-Fr. , from Old Fr. , probably from a Scandinavian source
wallet
wallop
Walter, Old N. Fr.  (Old Fr. ), of Germanic origin
war, Old N. Fr. , (compare Fr. ), from Frankish 
warble, Old N. Fr. , from Frankish 
warden, Old N. Fr. , (compare Fr. ), from Frankish 
warder, Anglo-Fr. , from Old N. Fr. , (compare Fr.  [to guard])
wardrobe, Old N. Fr.  (Old Fr. )
warrant, Old N. Fr.  (Old Fr. ), from Frankish 
warranty, Anglo-Fr. and Old N. Fr.  (Old Fr. )
warren, Anglo-Fr. and Old N. Fr.  (Old Fr. ), possibly from Gaulish 
warrior, Old N. Fr.  (Old Fr. )
waste (Old Northern Fr. , Cf Modern French  "to spoil, waste")
wicket, Old N. Fr.  (compare Fr. ), from a Germanic source
wile, Old N. Fr.  (Old Fr. )
William, Old N. Fr.  (Old Fr. ), of Germanic origin
wince, Old N. Fr.  (Old Fr. ), from Frankish 

X

xanthein
xebec Fr. , from Italian , from Arabic

Y

yaourt
yperite

Z

zany Fr. , from Italian  ["Johnny"]
zebu Fr. , from Tibetan
zenith Old Fr.  (compare modern Fr. ), from Arabic
zest Fr. 
zigzag Fr. 
zodiac Old Fr. , from Latin , from Greek 
zouave
zydeco
zygotene

See also 

 French phrases used by English speakers
 Law French
 Glossary of fencing, (predominantly from French).
 Glossary of ballet (predominantly from French)
 Lists of English loanwords by country or language of origin
 List of English words of Gaulish origin
 List of English words of Latin origin
 List of English Latinates of Germanic origin
 List of English words of Frankish origin
 Latin influence in English
 List of French words of Germanic origin
 List of French words of Gaulish origin
 List of French words of Arabic origin

References

External links
Oxford English Dictionary
Dictionary.com
Online Etymology Dictionary
Centre National de Ressources Textuelles et Lexicales 

French